Charlie Hunter (born 20 July 1996) is an Australian middle-distance runner who specializes in the 800 metres.

Hunter competed in the 2020 Tokyo Olympics. He came fourth in his Men's 800m heat with a time of 1:45:91. He qualified for the semi-final where he finished seventh and therefore was eliminated.

Early years 
Hunter grew up on the NSW Central Coast. From an early age he enjoyed swimming and surfing rather than running. He played football and rugby at school and then joined Little Athletics as an under-9.

Hunter graduated from high school in 2014 and concentrated on his running. He won the national U20 1500m during his gap year. In 2017, as a 21-year-old, Hunter applied for a scholarship at the University of Oregon in the USA. As he was now a mature student the process took a long time. Finally after 18 months he got the scholarship and made the NCAA 1500m final in his first season (2019).

Collegiate career 
In 2021, Hunter won the NCAA DI 800m Championships, running for the University of Oregon. At this meet, he set two Australian indoor records in just 24 hours. He broke his own national record for the indoor mile when he ran 3:53.49, then he broke the 800-metre indoor record with a 1:45.59 run, bettering Joseph Deng’s time of 1:47.27 set in 2019. On 22 June 2021 Hunter ran the second quickest 800-metre time ever by an Australian and claimed the third place on the Australian 800m team for the delayed 2020 Summer Games when he ran 1:44.35 at a meet in Portland. He came just 0.14 seconds short of Deng's national record time of 1:44.21, set in Monaco in 2018.

Professional
Hunter represented Australia in the junior race at the IAAF World Cross Country Championships in Guiyang, China, placing 106th in 28:28 over 8 km.

In December 2021, Hunter signed with Nike, Inc. and moved to Portland, Oregon, to train with coach Pete Julian's group (formerly Nike Oregon Project) Union Athletic Club.

References

External links
 Oregon Ducks bio
 
 
 Charlie Hunter bio Athletics Australia
 Loads of Quality: How Charlie Hunter Trains, August 19, 2021 Runner's Tribe

1996 births
Living people
Australian male middle-distance runners
Oregon Ducks men's track and field athletes
Oregon Ducks men's cross country runners
Athletes (track and field) at the 2020 Summer Olympics
Olympic athletes of Australia
People from Gosford
Sportspeople from Brisbane
Australian male cross country runners
Australian male long-distance runners
20th-century Australian people
21st-century Australian people